What I Do the Best is the fourth studio album by American country music artist John Michael Montgomery. The tracks "Ain't Got Nothin' on Us", "Friends", "How Was I to Know" and "I Miss You a Little" were all released as singles, peaking at #15, #2, #2 and #6, respectively on the Hot Country Songs charts, making this the first album of his career not to produce a #1 hit. The album was certified platinum by the RIAA for one million shipments in the US.

"Cloud 8" was later recorded by Canadian country artist Gil Grand on his 1998 debut album Famous First Words.

Track listing

Personnel
As listed in liner notes.
Eddie Bayers - drums
Barry Beckett - keyboards
Stephen Brewster - drums
Larry Byrom - electric guitar
Glen Duncan - fiddle
Paul Franklin - steel guitar, Dobro
Dann Huff - electric guitar
John McFee - electric guitar
Terry McMillan - percussion, harmonica
Carl Marsh - keyboards
John Michael Montgomery - lead vocals
Steve Nathan - keyboards
Louis Dean Nunley - background vocals
Don Potter - acoustic guitar
Michael Rhodes - bass guitar
Brent Rowan - electric guitar
John Wesley Ryles - background vocals
Leland Sklar - bass guitar
Billy Joe Walker Jr. - acoustic guitar
Biff Watson - acoustic guitar
Dennis Wilson - background vocals
Curtis "Mr. Harmony" Young - background vocals

Charts

Weekly charts

Year-end charts

References

Allmusic (see infobox)

1996 albums
Atlantic Records albums
John Michael Montgomery albums